Delphine Diallo or Delphine Diaw Diallo (born 1977 in Paris) is a French-Senegalese photographer. She was originally based in Saint-Louis, Senegal, but now works in New York City.

Biography
Delphine Diallo is a Brooklyn-based French and Senegalese visual artist and photographer.

She graduated from the Académie Charpentier School of Visual Art in Paris in 1999, before working in the music industry for seven years as a special-effects motion artist, video editor and graphic designer. In 2008, she moved to New York to explore her own practice after giving up a cooperate Art Director role in Paris. Diallo was mentored by photographer and artist Peter Beard, who was impressed by her creativity and spontaneity before offering her to collaborate for the Pirelli calendar photo shoot in Botswana. Inspired by new environments on this trip, she decided to return to her father's home city of Saint-Louis in Senegal to start her own vision quest.

Seeking to challenge the norms of our society, Diallo immerses herself in the realm of anthropology, mythology, religion, science and martial arts to release her mind. Her work takes her to far remote areas, as she insists on spending intimate time with her subjects to better able represent their most innate energy "I treat my process as if it were an adventure liberating a new protagonist" — Diallo’s powerful portraitures unmask and stir an uninhibited insight that allows her audience to see beyond the facade. "We are in constant search for wonder and growth. I see art as a vessel to express consciousness and an access to diffuse wisdom, enlightenment, fear, beauty, ugliness, mystery, faith, strength, fearless, universal matter."

Wherever she can, Diallo combines artistry with activism, pushing the many possibilities of empowering women, youth, and cultural minorities through visual provocation. Diallo uses analog, digital photography and collages  as she continues to explore new mediums. She is working towards creating new dimensions and a place where consciousness and art are a universal language by connecting artists, sharing ideas and learning.

Selected exhibitions 

 2019: African Spirits, Yossi Milo Gallery / Fisheye Gallery
 2019: MIA Photo fair – Italia / Fisheye Gallery
 2019: Photo London / Somerset House / Fisheye Gallery
 2018: Art Basel Miami No Commission
 2018: Paris Photo / Fisheye Gallery
 2018: Les rencontres d Arles / Fisheye Gallery Paris "Invisible Symbole"
 2018: Cambridge - Resignification, The Ethelbert Cooper Gallery
 2018: ''The Grace of Black Women, National Arts Club in New York
 2017: No Commission, Berlin, Curated by Swizz Beats and the Dean Collection, Germany
 2016: Unseen Photo Fair, Red Hook Lab Gallery, Brooklyn, New York
 2016: No Commission NY. Curated by Swizz Beats and The Dean Collection, Bronx, New York
 2015: Looking for America, Diffusion, Cardiff International Festival of Photography, Wales
 2015: Photoquai, 5ème Biennale des images du monde, Musée du Quai Branly, Paris, France
 2014: Intangible Beauty, Part I & II, Kasher Potamkin Gallery, New York, New York
 2014: Portraits by Delphine Diallo. Curated by Jamel Shabazz, Photoville, Brooklyn, New York
 2014: Harlem Postcards, Studio Museum in Harlem, New York
 2013: Emerging: Visual Art & Music in a Post-Hip-Hop Era, Museum of Contemporary African Diasporic Art, Brooklyn, New York
 2013: Freedom Ride, Brooklyn Academy of Music, New York
 2012: Highness / Magic Photo Studio, Addis Foto Fest, Ethiopia
 2012: Africa, See You, See Me, Dak’Art OFF, Goethe-Institut, Dakar, Senegal
 2012: The Great Vision, Mariane Ibrahim Abdi (M.I.A.) Gallery, Seattle, Washington
 2012: Configured, Benrimon Contemporary, New York, New York
 2012: Voice of Home, Jenkins Johnson Gallery, New York, New York
 2011: Curate NYC, online exhibitions and guest curated shows, New York
 2011: Pixelating: Black image in the age of digital reproduction, Lambent Foundation, Museum of Contemporary African Diasporic Art, Brooklyn, New York
 2011: The African Continuum, United Nations, New York, New York
 2011: Selected mixed media works, Opera Gallery, New York, New York
 2011: Are You a Hybrid?, Museum of Art and Design, New York, New York
 2011: Africa, See You, See Me, Fondazione Studio Marangoni & Officine Fotografiche, Rome, Italy
 2011: The Black Portrait. Curated by Hank Willis Thomas and Natasha L. Logan, RUSH Art Gallery, New York, New York
 2010: Africa, See You, See Me'', Museu da Cidade, Lisboa, Portugal

References

External links
Official website

21st-century photographers
French women photographers
21st-century French women
Senegalese women artists
French people of Senegalese descent
Senegalese people of French descent
1977 births
Artists from Paris
Living people
21st-century women photographers
Senegalese photographers